The Abierto Tampico is a tournament for professional female tennis players played on outdoor hard courts. The event is classified as a WTA 125 event after it was upgraded in 2022. Before that, it used to be held as a $100,000+H ITF Women's Circuit tournament. The tournament was established in Tampico, Mexico, in 2013.

Past finals

Singles

Doubles

External links 
 ITF search
 Official website

ITF Women's World Tennis Tour
Hard court tennis tournaments
Tennis tournaments in Mexico
Recurring sporting events established in 2013
Recurring sporting events disestablished in 2017